The Cuba national Baseball5 team represents Cuba in international Baseball5 competitions. They are the current world champions.

History
Baseball5 was inspired by similar games that have been played on the streets in Latin America and elsewhere for decades, such as "cuatro esquinas" (four corners) in Cuba.

Cuba, alongside Venezuela, were invited by the World Baseball Softball Confederation to represent WBSC Americas in the 2022 Baseball5 World Cup, held in Mexico City. The Cuban team finished the tournament undefeated and won the final against Japan 2 matches to 0.

Current roster

Staff

Tournament record

Baseball5 World Cup

References

National baseball5 teams
Baseball5